In the mathematical discipline of graph theory, a graph labelling is the assignment of labels, traditionally represented by integers, to edges and/or vertices of a graph.

In this case, the graph is called an edge-labeled graph.

When the edge labels are members of an ordered set (e.g., the real numbers), it may be called a weighted graph.

When used without qualification, the term labeled graph generally refers to a vertex-labeled graph with all labels distinct. Such a graph may equivalently be labeled by the consecutive integers , where  is the number of vertices in the graph. For many applications, the edges or vertices are given labels that are meaningful in the associated domain. For example, the edges may be assigned weights representing the "cost" of traversing between the incident vertices.

In the above definition a graph is understood to be a finite undirected simple graph. However, the notion of labelling may be applied to all extensions and generalizations of graphs. For example, in automata theory and formal language theory it is convenient to consider labeled multigraphs, i.e., a pair of vertices may be connected by several labeled edges.

History
Most graph labellings trace their origins to labellings presented by Alexander Rosa in his 1967 paper. Rosa identified three types of labellings, which he called , -, and -labellings. -labellings were later renamed as "graceful" by Solomon Golomb, and the name has been popular since.

Special cases

Graceful labelling

In his original paper, Rosa proved that all Eulerian graphs with size equivalent to 1 or 2 (mod 4) are not graceful. Whether or not certain families of graphs are graceful is an area of graph theory under extensive study. Arguably, the largest unproven conjecture in graph labelling is the Ringel–Kotzig conjecture, which hypothesizes that all trees are graceful. This has been proven for all paths, caterpillars, and many other infinite families of trees. Anton Kotzig himself has called the effort to prove the conjecture a "disease".

Edge-graceful labelling

A graph  is said to be "edge-graceful" if it admits an edge-graceful labelling.

Edge-graceful labellings were first introduced by Sheng-Ping Lo in 1985.

A necessary condition for a graph to be edge-graceful is "Lo's condition":

Harmonious labelling
A "harmonious graph" is one that has a harmonious labelling. Odd cycles are harmonious, as are Petersen graphs. It is conjectured that trees are all harmonious if one vertex label is allowed to be reused. The seven-page book graph  provides an example of a graph that is not harmonious.

Graph colouring

A graph colouring is a subclass of graph labellings. Vertex colourings assign different labels to adjacent vertices, while edge colourings assign different labels to adjacent edges.

Lucky labelling

References

 

Extensions and generalizations of graphs